Kiddy Citny is a German artist and musician, born in Stuttgart in 1957.  He was raised in Bremen and later moved to West Berlin, Amsterdam, London, Zurich, Bern, Los Angeles, Munich, and Berlin.

Citny is a member of the band Sprung Aus Den Wolken.  As an artist, he often uses pictograms and epigrams in his work. He's known for painting parts of the Berlin Wall, at least a dozen sections of which were auctioned after its fall in 1989.  Some segments are now in the United States.

See also
 List of German painters

References

1957 births
Living people
German male artists
German male musicians